Gerhard Paul Fettweis (born March 16, 1962 in Antwerp) is a German-American Electrical Engineer and Professor for Telco-Engineering.

Gerhard's father Alfred Fettweis invented the Wave Digital Filter. With a scholarship from the prestigious Studienstiftung des deutschen Volkes Gerhard studied Electrical Engineering at the RWTH Aachen from 1981 to 1986, and completed his PhD there in 1990. He then worked as a visiting scholar with IBM and TCSI Inc. in Berkeley. As of 1994 he holds the Vodafone Chair for Mobile Communications Systems at the Technischen Universität Dresden.

In 2016 he became a member of the German Academy of Sciences Leopoldina.

References

External links 
Homepage Gerhard Fettweis

1962 births
Living people
Academic staff of TU Dresden
People associated with electricity
Electrical engineers
Fellow Members of the IEEE
Engineering academics
Members of the German Academy of Sciences Leopoldina